Christmas is an EP by the indie rock band Low. It was released in 1999 on Kranky. A Christmas album, it was released as a gift to fans. In 2013, the A.V. Club's Josh Modell described it as "the religious album even heathens can love".

Track listing
"Just Like Christmas" – 3:08
"Long Way Around the Sea" – 4:38
"The Little Drummer Boy" – 4:52
"If You Were Born Today (Song for Little Baby Jesus)" – 4:50
"Blue Christmas" – 3:22
"Silent Night" – 4:23
"Taking Down the Tree" – 2:44
"One Special Gift" – 1:48

"If You Were Born Today (Song For Little Baby Jesus)"

"If You Were Born Today (Song For Little Baby Jesus)" was released as a 7-inch single from the EP with "Blue Christmas" as a B-side.

References

1999 Christmas albums
Christmas albums by American artists
Low (band) EPs
Kranky EPs
1999 EPs
Christmas EPs